Yodsanan Sor Nanthachai or Yodsanan Sityodtong a.k.a. Yodsanan 3-K Battery (Thai: ยอดสนั่น 3เคแบตเตอรี่; born name Theera Phongwan new name Theepaphat Phongwankittikun August 17, 1974 in Phrai Bueng District, Srisaket Province, Thailand) is a Thai professional boxer in the super featherweight division. Yodsanan is a former WBA super featherweight champion, a title he held from 2002 to 2005.

In addition to boxing, he is also a mixed martial artist who competed for ONE Championship in their Bantamweight division from 2011 to 2017. Yodsanan fights out of Evolve MMA in Singapore, where he is a member of the Evolve Fight Team.

He is known as the Thai Tyson due to his KO power, having won 45 of 56 fights by knockout, and is one of the best boxers Thailand has ever produced.

Boxing 
Yodsanan turned pro in 1993 and won his first five fights by KO. In 1997 he defeated Run Tangkilisan to win the interim PABA Super Featherweight Title. He defended the title 20 times before vacating it in order to challenge for the WBA Super Featherweight title which he won by defeating Lakva Sim on 13 April 2002.

Yodsanan successfully defended the title three times defeating Lamont Pearson, Ryuhei Suguta and Steve Forbes. On 30 April 2005 he faced challenger Vicente Mosquera at Madison Square Garden. Yodsanan became the first man to ever knock Mosquera down but still lost the fight by unanimous decision.

On 2 February 2009, Yodsanan defeated Jonathan Simamora by third-round knockout to win the vacant IBF Australasian Light Welterweight title.

Muay Thai
Yodsanan has fought several professional Muay Thai fights. Notably on 8 March 2007 when he fought Bovy Sor Udomson at Rajadamnern Stadium losing by decision.

Mixed martial arts
In early 2011 it emerged that Yodsanan had started training in mixed martial arts at Evolve MMA in Singapore. On July 15, 2011, it was announced that Yodsanan had signed with ONE Fighting Championship. This has led some journalists to suggest that Yodsanan will be the best boxer to ever switch from boxing to MMA.

Yodsanan made his professional debut when he fought South African Muay Thai champion Daniel Mashamaite at ONE Fighting Championship: Champion vs. Champion at the Singapore Indoor Stadium on September 3, 2011. He won the fight via TKO in the second round after landing a stunning flying knee to the face of his opponent. On March 31, 2012, Yodsanan faced Jiang Long Yun at ONE Fighting Championship: War of the Lions in his second MMA appearance, where he lost via first-round submission.

He would take a hiatus from mixed martial arts before returning four years later on May 27, 2016, to defeat Khon Sichan at ONE Championship: Kingdom of Champions. On March 11, 2017, Yodsanan faced Ramon Gonzalez at ONE Championship: Warrior Kingdom, which saw him score a comeback victory via verbal submission. On December 9, 2017, he defeated Dodi Mardian by first-round, one-punch knockout at ONE Championship: Warriors of the World.

Professional boxing record

Mixed martial arts record

|-
| Win
| align=center| 4–1
| Dodi Mardian
| KO (punch)
| ONE Championship: Warriors of the World
| 
| align=center| 1
| align=center| 1:32
|IMPACT Arena, Bangkok, Thailand
| 
|-
| Win
| align=center| 3–1
| Ramon Gonzalez
| Submission (verbal)
| ONE Championship: Warrior Kingdom
| 
| align=center| 2
| align=center| 3:21
|IMPACT Arena, Bangkok, Thailand
| 
|-
| Win
| align=center| 2–1
| Khon Sichan
| TKO (punches)
| ONE Championship: Kingdom of Champions
| 
| align=center| 1
| align=center| 3:44
|IMPACT Arena, Bangkok, Thailand
| 
|-
| Loss
| align=center| 1–1
| Jiang Long Yun
| Submission (rear naked choke)
| ONE Fighting Championship: War of the Lions
| 
| align=center| 1
| align=center| 4:28
| Kallang, Singapore
| 
|-
| Win
| align=center| 1–0
| Daniel Mashamaite
| TKO (flying knee)
| ONE Fighting Championship 1: Champion vs. Champion
| 
| align=center| 2
| align=center| 0:14
| Kallang, Singapore
|

Muay Thai record

|-  style="background:#fbb;"
| 2007-03-08 || Loss ||align=left| Bovy Sor Udomson || Wansongchai Fights, Rajadamnern Stadium || Bangkok, Thailand || Decision || 5 || 3:00
|-
| colspan=9 | Legend:

Personal life
In 2009, he was a boxing trainer for Evolve MMA in Singapore.

In November 2010, he received an honorary master's degree in sports science from Sisaket Rajabhat University.

References

External links
 
 
 
 BoxRec: Theera Phongwan

1974 births
Living people
Yodsanan Sor Nanthachai
Mixed martial artists utilizing Muay Thai
Mixed martial artists utilizing boxing
Yodsanan Sor Nanthachai
Yodsanan Sor Nanthachai
Yodsanan Sor Nanthachai
Yodsanan Sor Nanthachai